Huib Emmer (born 6 September 1951 in Utrecht) is a Dutch composer.  He also plays electric guitar and electric bass guitar.

He performed at the Claxon Sound Festival -for improvised music (1984) in the Netherlands, and featured in The Best of the Claxon Festival (1984) voor VPRO-tv (1984) with the Huib Emmer Quinet Skid  with Willem van der Ham (sax) Peter van Bergen (sax), Gerard Bouwhuis (keyboard) Hans van der Meer (drums)
From 1976 to 1986 Emmer was a member of the Dutch minimal ensemble Hoketus and he has performed since 1988 in the ensemble LOOS.  Since 1992 he has also composed for electronic media, often in combination with projected video or film.

References

 Huib Emmer page at Donemus/MuziekGroup Nederland (in Dutch)
 Huib Emmer Extensive PDF profile (in Dutch)

External links
 

1951 births
Living people
20th-century classical composers
Dutch male classical composers
Dutch classical composers
21st-century classical composers
Musicians from Utrecht (city)
20th-century Dutch male musicians
21st-century male musicians